Yoo So-young (Hangul: 유소영; born March 29, 1986) is a South Korean actress and former member of the girl group After School. She is known for her supporting roles in Korean dramas, including Dream High 2 and High Society.

Career 
Yoo So-young debuted with After School's unofficial first appearance on December 29, 2008, at the SBS Song Festival, performing "Play Girlz" with Son Dam-bi. Prior to that, she made an appearance on KBS "TV Kindergarten One Two Three" as Hana; she also took part in 75th "Miss Chunhyang pageant", winning second place, in 2005. After School officially debuted in January 2009. She graduated from the group on October 29, 2009, to pursue a career in acting.

Discography

Filmography

Variety show

References

External links

1986 births
Living people
Pledis Entertainment artists
South Korean female idols
South Korean women pop singers
South Korean television actresses
After School (band) members
21st-century South Korean singers
21st-century South Korean women singers
21st-century South Korean actresses